Turkey men's national goalball team is the men's national team of Turkey.  Goalball is a team sport designed specifically for athletes with a vision impairment.  The team takes part in international goalball competitions.

Paralympic Games

2012 London 

The team competed in the 2012 Summer Paralympics from 30 August to 7 September 2012, in the Copper Box Arena, London, England.  There were twelve men's and ten women's teams (an increase of two more women's teams from past years).

The national team qualified for the first time at the Paralympics in the 2012 Summer Paralympics and won the bronze medal defeating the team of Lithuania in the third place match.

The bronze medal-winning squad at the 2012 Summer Paralympics, consisted of following players:

2020 Tokyo 

The team competed in the 2020 Summer Paralympics, with competition from Wednesday 25 August to finals on Friday 3 September 2021, in the Makuhari Messe arena, Chiba, Tokyo, Japan.

Round-robin

World Championships  

IBSA World Goalball Championships have been held every four years from 1978.  Placing first or second in the tournament may earn a berth in the Paralympic Games goalball tournaments.

2022 Matosinhos 

The team competed in the 2022 World Championships from 7 to 16 December 2022, at the Centro de Desportos e Congressos de Matosinhos, Portugal.  There were sixteen men's and sixteen women's teams.  They placed second in Pool C, and fifth in final standings.

Regional championships 

The team competes in the IBSA Europe goalball region.  Groups A and C are held one year, and Group B the following year.  Strong teams move towards Group A.

2007 Antalya 

Turkey men's goalball national team, initially competing in the Group C, won the 2007 IBSA European Goalball Championships held in Antalya, Turkey, and was promoted to the Group B.

2011 Assens (Group A) 

In 2011, the national team became runner-up at the IBSA European Championships in Assens, Denmark, and was promoted to the Group A.

Results

See also 

 Disabled sports
 Turkey women's national goalball team
 Turkey at the Paralympics

References

 
National men's goalball teams
Turkey at the Paralympics
European national goalball teams
Goalball in Turkey